Qareh Tappeh is a village in the Ardabil Province of Iran.

It is located 20 km north-east of Qom and is the site of the archeological excavation of Qamroud village.

References

Tageo

Populated places in Ardabil Province